State Fair is a 1962 American musical film directed by José Ferrer and starring Pat Boone, Bobby Darin, Ann-Margret, Tom Ewell, Pamela Tiffin and Alice Faye. A remake of the 1933 film State Fair and the 1945 film State Fair, it was considered to be a financially and critically unsuccessful film.
Richard Rodgers, whose collaborator Oscar Hammerstein had died in 1960, wrote additional songs, both music and lyrics, for this film adaptation of the 1932 novel by Phil Stong.

While the 1933 and 1945 versions were set at the Iowa State Fair, the 1962 version was set in Texas (the family drives through Dallas where the State Fair of Texas is held). It was filmed on sound stages at Twentieth Century Fox in California and on location at various places in Texas, at Mooney's Grove park in Visalia, California and at the Oklahoma State Fair Raceway in Oklahoma City, home of the Oklahoma State Fair, where the climactic speedway sequence was shot.

The novel "State Fair" would be dramatized twice more following the 1962 film. The first State Fair stage musical, which utilized a variety of Rodgers and Hammerstein songs (many originally written for projects not related to the State Fair film), was first produced in 1969. A revised version of this stage musical was produced in the 1990s and eventually played on Broadway. A non-musical version of State Fair was also filmed for television in 1976.

Cast
 Pat Boone as Wayne Frake
 Bobby Darin as Jerry Dundee
 Pamela Tiffin as Margy Frake
 Ann-Margret as Emily Porter
 Tom Ewell as Abel Frake
 Alice Faye as Melissa Frake
 Wally Cox as Hipplewaite
 Meat Loaf as Boy in Stands (uncredited)

Production
Twentieth Century Fox production head Buddy Adler announced the film in January 1960 with Rodgers and Hammerstein slated to write new songs for it. Charles Brackett was named producer and Walter Lang was named director. It would be the third version of the film produced by Fox. Adler said that he hoped that the film would be ready by Christmas and that it would not be a musical, but "it will have plenty of songs from Rodgers and Hammerstein."

Brackett called the story "... a beautiful property. It's a story about people with simple projects with which the audience can get really involved – the man who wants his boy to get a prize, the woman interested in her mincemeat, the girl who wants adventure and finds a fast young man at the fair."

Production was delayed when Adler died in July 1960. Hammerstein died the following month, at which point Rodgers decided to write the lyrics himself.

José Ferrer had just made Return to Peyton Place for Fox and was signed to direct.

The female lead was given to Ann-Margret, who was under contract to 20th Century Fox. They had loaned her to Paramount to make her first film, Pocketful of Miracles, and this would be her second. Bound by the terms of an old commitment to Fox, she was paid only $500 a week during her three months of work on the production.

Alice Faye came out of retirement to play the mother. She wanted Don Ameche to play her husband, but the role went to Tom Ewell.

The film was shot in September and October 1961 at the Texas State Fair Grounds and at the Oklahoma City State Fair Grounds.

A Dallas teenager named Marvin Lee Aday — later to find fame as singer Meat Loaf — made his first screen appearance in State Fair, as an extra. He and a friend can be seen pointing at a hog during a scene that features Tom Ewell.

Song list
 "Our State Fair"
 "It Might as Well Be Spring"
 "That's for Me"
 "Never Say No to a Man" (added in the 1962 version) – Lyrics and Music by Richard Rodgers
 "It's a Grand Night For Singing"
 "Willing and Eager" (added in the 1962 version) – Lyrics and Music by Richard Rodgers
 "This Isn't Heaven" (added in the 1962 version) – Lyrics and Music by Richard Rodgers
 "The Little Things In Texas" (added in the 1962 version) – Lyrics and Music by Richard Rodgers
 "More Than Just a Friend" (added in the 1962 version) – Lyrics and Music by Richard Rodgers
 "Isn't It Kind of Fun?" (moved in the 1962 version)

A soundtrack album was released briefly on Dot Records, as Boone had an exclusive contract
with the label.

Reception
According to Kinematograph Weekly the film was considered a "money maker" at the British box office in 1962.

Reviewing the film, Diabolique magazine later wrote:
It just doesn’t work. It’s not the material. Sure, it’s cheesy, but The Sound of Music (1965) was cheesy and that came along three years later. I feel the main problem is too many key people were miscast. Jose Ferrer was not the right director and most of the cast fall short of their 1945 counterparts. Tom Ewell seems too urban to play “paw” compared to Charles Winninger. Pamela Tiffin looks like an urban ditz rather than a sweet naive country girl like Jeanne Crain. Bobby Darin (another pop star turned actor) comes across as sleazy rather than sharp like Dana Andrews. Ann-Margret was always better as good girls who looked as though they wanted to be naughty (Viva Las Vegas, Bye Bye Birdie) rather than straight-out naughty girls. Alice Faye looks like Alice Faye coming out of retirement (it was her last film) whereas Fay Bainter felt like a character. The one exception is Pat Boone who is far better than Dick Haymes, but he can't save things.

References

External links
 
 
 
 State Fair Original Trailer (1962), Texas Archive of the Moving Image

1962 films
1962 musical films
American auto racing films
American musical films
CinemaScope films
American films based on plays
Films directed by José Ferrer
Films produced by Charles Brackett
Films set in Texas
Films shot in Dallas
Films shot in Oklahoma City
Films with screenplays by Sonya Levien
Musical film remakes
State Fair of Texas
State Fair (franchise)
20th Century Fox films
1960s English-language films
1960s American films